Cyana formosana is a moth of the family Erebidae first described by George Hampson in 1909. It is found in Taiwan.

The wingspan is 31–43 mm. Adults are on wing in May.

References

Moths described in 1909
Cyana